Sir Joseph Gurney Pease, 5th Baronet (born 16 November 1927) is a British hotelier and a Liberal Party politician.

Background
Gurney Pease is the second son of Alfred Edward Pease, and his 3rd wife, Emily Elizabeth Smith. His elder brother would become Sir Alfred Vincent Pease, 4th Baronet. He was educated at Bootham School, York. In 1953 he married Shelagh Munro Bulman. They have one son, Charles Edward Gurney Pease, and one daughter, Jane Elizabeth Gurney Pease. In 2008 he succeeded his brother Vincent to the family baronetcy.

Professional career
Gurney Pease was a director and secretary of a private company of hotel proprietors.

Political career
In 1950, Gurney Pease was elected to Guisborough Urban District Council, on which he served one three-year term. He was vice-chairman of Darlington Liberal Association. He was Liberal candidate for the Bishop Auckland division of County Durham at the 1959 General Election. 

In 1961 he served as President of the North East England Young Liberal Federation. He was Liberal candidate for the Darlington division of County Durham at the 1964 General Election. 

In 1969 he was elected to the Liberal Party Council. 
He was Liberal candidate for the Westmorland division at the 1970 General Election.

From 1970-71 he served as President of the North West England Regional Liberal Party. 
He was Liberal candidate for the Penrith and The Border division at the October 1974 General Election.

He did not stand for parliament again.

Publications 
"A Wealth of Happiness and Many Bitter Trials" The life and journals of Sir Alfred Edward Pease Bt. (1992) William Sessions of York.

References

1927 births
Liberal Party (UK) parliamentary candidates
People educated at Bootham School
Baronets in the Baronetage of the United Kingdom
Living people
Gurney